Rudolf Kattnigg (9 April 1895, in Carinthia – 2 September 1955, in Klagenfurt) was an Austrian composer, pianist and conductor.

Life and career
Kattnigg studied composition under Joseph Marx at the Vienna State Academy for music and visual arts. After completing his music studies, he was given a post as a professor there in the 1920s. In 1928 he assumed the post of Director of the Innsbruck Conservatorium, as well as becoming the conductor of the symphony orchestra there. These jobs were interspersed with engagements in Vienna and Zürich.

His works include operettas, ballets, symphonies, songs, works for orchestra and choir, as well as film music. Characteristic features of his compositions are the instrumentation and the manipulation of melodies, songs and his native folk songs.

Selected works

Operettas
 Der Prinz von Thule (1935) (The Prince of Thule)
 Balkanliebe (1936) (Balkan Love)
 Mädels vom Rhein (Rhinemaidens)
 Donna Miranda 
 Kaiserin Katharina (1935) (Empress Catherine)
 Bel Ami (1949)

Other works
 Slowenische Tänze (Slovenian Dances)
 Piano Concerto (1934, published 1936)

Sources
Much of the content of this article comes from the equivalent German-language Wikipedia article (retrieved September, 2007).

External links
 Rudolf Kattnigg 

1895 births
1955 deaths
20th-century classical composers
20th-century male musicians
Austrian classical composers
Austrian male classical composers
Pupils of Joseph Marx